Teresa Sarti Strada,  (28 March 1946 – 1 September 2009) was an Italian teacher, pacifist and philanthropist who, together with her husband Gino Strada, founded Emergency, an NGO dedicated to providing free medical treatment to the victims of war, poverty and land mines. She was the organization's first president.

Life 
The youngest daughter of a plumber and housewife, Teresa Sarti was born and raised in Sesto San Giovanni, a working-class suburb of Milan. The early death of her mother, when her older sisters had left home and married, left her responsible for the care of her father and the family home. In 1968, she graduated in modern literature from the Catholic University of Milan, with a thesis on the teaching of history.

She began her teaching career at Giolli State Middle School, in Bicocca, a neighbouring district of Milan, whose population was mostly made up of poor immigrants from the south of Italy and dominated by organized crime. She continued her teaching career at high schools, first at Agnesi then at Gentileschi. In her teaching she recognised – inspired by Bertolt Brecht's poems translated into Italian by Franco Fortini – that history consisted of more than just the kings, conquerors and powerful people of school history textbooks. According to Sandra D'Alessandro, Teresa Sarti was a strict teacher, but was also ready and willing to help students in difficulty, both inside and outside school.

In 1971 she met Gino Strada, then a student of medicine; the two got married and in 1979 their daughter and only child, Cecilia Strada was born. She continued to teach history and philosophy in middle and high schools. In 1994 she founded the NGO Emergency together with her husband.

In the fifteen years at the helm of Emergency she led humanitarian cooperation and health development projects aimed at the construction and management of many hospitals, including a cardiac surgery center of excellence – the Salam Centre for Cardiac Surgery – in Sudan.

She was opposed to all forms of violence Luigi Iannone described her as "an idefatigable pacifist" who would do everything in her power for human rights and international peace.

In 2007 she received the Art.3 Award "for her daily commitment to relieve the victims of war and the less fortunate from pain".

She died in Milan from pancreatic cancer, after a two-year illness, on 1 September 2009.

On 21 December, her daughter Cecilia was elected to replace her as president of Emergency.

See also
 List of peace activists

Notes

Footnotes

Citations

Sources

Further reading

External links 

 Official website of Emergency

1946 births
2009 deaths
Deaths from pancreatic cancer
Italian anti-war activists
Italian human rights activists
People from Sesto San Giovanni
Università Cattolica del Sacro Cuore alumni